The Substitute is a 2022 internationally co-produced drama film directed by Diego Lerman starring Juan Minujín and Bárbara Lennie alongside Alfredo Castro, Rita Cortese, and María Merlino. It is a Latin-American and European co-production among companies from Argentina, Spain, Italy, Mexico, and France.

Plot 
The plot concerns about the mishaps of an interim teacher (Lucio) in the suburbs of Buenos Aires, as he is forced to take a stance once one of his students is threatened by a druglord.

Cast

Production 
In 2019, the project (previously known under the working title ) participated in the 8th Europe-Latin America Co-Production Forum, a platform of the San Sebastián International Film Festival created to foster new audiovisual co-productions. The screenplay was penned by Diego Lerman, María Meira, and Luciana De Mello. It is a co-production by companies from Argentina, Spain, Italy, Mexico, and France. Filming started by late 2021. Shooting locations included  (Dock Sud, Avellaneda).

Release 
The film was picked up in the 'Special Presentations' selection of the 47th Toronto International Film Festival, where it made its world premiere on 11 September 2022. It was also selected within 70th San Sebastián International Film Festival's official selection line-up, and had its NY premiere as the opening night film of the 22nd Havana Film Festival New York. It was released in Argentina on 20 October 2022. It is set for a 13 January 2023 theatrical release date in Spain.

Accolades 

|-
| align = "center" | 2022 || 70th San Sebastián International Film Festival || Silver Shell for Best Supporting Performance || Renata Lerman ||  || 
|-
| align = "center" | 2022 || 22nd Havana Film Festival New York || Havana Star Prize for Best Director || Diego Lerman ||  || 
|}

See also 
 List of Argentine films of 2022
 List of Spanish films of 2023

References 

2022 drama films
2022 films
Argentine drama films
Spanish drama films
Italian drama films
Mexican drama films
French drama films
Films about educators
Films shot in Argentina
Films set in Argentina
Arcadia Motion Pictures films
2020s French films
2020s Spanish films
2020s Spanish-language films
2020s Italian films
2020s Argentine films
2020s Mexican films